Qin Chenglu (born ) is a Chinese male  track cyclist. He participated at the 2015 UCI Track Cycling World Championships. He won the gold medal in the  team pursuit  at the 2016 Asian Cycling Championships.

References

External links
 Profile at cyclingarchives.com

1992 births
Living people
Chinese track cyclists
Chinese male cyclists
Place of birth missing (living people)
Asian Games medalists in cycling
Asian Games gold medalists for China
Cyclists at the 2014 Asian Games
Cyclists at the 2018 Asian Games
Medalists at the 2014 Asian Games
Medalists at the 2018 Asian Games
Olympic cyclists of China
Cyclists at the 2016 Summer Olympics
21st-century Chinese people